is a Japanese manga series written and illustrated by Fujimomo. It was serialized in Kodansha's Dessert magazine from July 2015 to May 2020. It was published in twelve tankōbon volumes.

Media

Manga
The series is written and illustrated by Fujimomo. It started serialization in Kodansha's Dessert magazine on July 24, 2015. A promotion was held on Twitter to celebrate the release of the second volume. In the tenth volume of the series, it was announced the eleventh volume would bring its climax. The manga finished in Dessert on May 23, 2020. After the ending, the series was given a side-story chapter.

At Anime NYC 2017, Kodansha USA announced they licensed the series digitally. During a live stream on March 25, 2021, they announced a print release for the series.

Volume list

Drama CDs
A drama CD was released alongside the eleventh volume. It featured acting from Ari Ozawa, Nobuhiko Okamoto, Saori Ōnishi, Kazuyuki Okitsu, and Yusuke Shirai. Another drama CD was made to coincide with the release of the final volume. It featured the same cast as the previous drama CD.

Reception
The series was nominated for the Kodansha Manga Award in the shōjo category in 2018. A member of the Bessatsu Friend and Dessert editorial team picked the series as their favorite shōjo manga in 2018.

Michelle Smith from Soliloquy in Blue praised the first three volumes for the characters and unique plot, stating that they "really enjoyed" them.

References

External links
 

Fiction about social media
Japanese radio dramas
Kodansha manga
Romantic comedy anime and manga
School life in anime and manga
Shōjo manga